Hans Särkijärvi (born March 3, 1957) is a Swedish ice hockey coach and former player. Särkijärvi started his playing career in his hometown team Kiruna AIF in 1973. He only played a few games in the senior team before moving to Stockholm-based Djurgårdens IF. The eight seasons he spent in Djurgården included a Swedish championship in 1983. Särkijärvi joined Södertälje SK for the 1983–84 season, where he also won a Swedish championship in 1985. After six seasons in Södertälje Särkijärvi ended his elite playing career and started to play in Sollefteå HK where he only stayed for one season. The last club he played for was IFK Lidingö during the 1990–91 season. He is currently head coach of tier 3 team Visby/Roma HK.

Särkijärvi coached Södertälje along with Johan Hemlin during two seasons. However, the poor results in the beginning of the 2002–03 season, which was their third season, made the two coaches leave the club. Särkijärvi took the job as coach for Djurgården's under-18 team for the 2004–05 season. He then replaced Niklas Wikegård in the senior team for the following season. He left his position as coach of Djurgården after the 2007–08 season. On 19 March 2008 he became head coach of Skellefteå AIK. He left after two seasons, and prior to the 2010–11 season he signed as the head coach of Linköpings HC. He was fired from the club during the 2011–12 mid-season, and was replaced by Harald Lückner.

After his stint with Linköping he went back to Djurgården and trained the junior team. In January 2014 he was promoted to head coach of the senior team when Tony Zabel left.

He was a major part of the team's success and way back to Swedish Hockey League.

Career statistics

References

External links
 

1957 births
Djurgårdens IF Hockey players
Södertälje SK players
Living people
Swedish ice hockey forwards
Swedish ice hockey coaches
Swedish people of Finnish descent
Djurgårdens IF Hockey coaches